is a 2008 Japanese action splatter film co-written, edited and directed by Yoshihiro Nishimura and starring Eihi Shiina as Ruka, a vengeful police officer.

Tokyo Gore Police was released to several film festivals in North America. It received generally positive reviews, noting that it lives up to its title by being gory, perverse and bizarre.

Plot
The film is set in a near future chaotic Japan. A mad scientist known as the "Key Man" (Itsuji Itao) has created a virus that mutates humans into monstrous creatures called "Engineers" that sprout bizarre weapons from any injury. The Tokyo Police Force has been privatized to deal with this new threat of engineers, so a special squad of officers called "Engineer Hunters" are created to deal with them. The Engineer Hunters are a private quasi-military force that utilize violence, sadism, and streetside executions to maintain law and order.

Helping the police force is Ruka (Eihi Shiina), a troubled loner who is very skilled in dispatching the Engineers. Along with helping the police, she is looking for the killer of her father, an old-fashioned officer who was murdered in broad daylight by a mysterious assassin. Ruka soon receives a new case to hunt down the Key Man, but once she encounters him, he infects her by inserting a key-shaped tumor into her scar-riddled left forearm before disappearing. Meanwhile, the police chief (Yukihide Benny) becomes infected while visiting a strip-club featuring several Engineers as the dancers, and massacres the main precinct, causing the Tokyo police commissioner (Shun Sugata) to order a city-wide crackdown on Engineers — indiscriminately executing anyone suspected of being one.

While continuing her investigation, Ruka learns that the Key Man was originally a scientist named Akino Miyama, and visits his home, where he reveals the truth about their past: His father was a police sniper who was forced to resign after a sniping operation gone wrong. Desperate to keep his family out of poverty, he was paid to assassinate Ruka's father, who was leading a rally against the privatization of the police force. But shortly after gunning down Ruka's father before her eyes, he was murdered by the police commissioner — the real mastermind of the assassination — in front of Miyama. Enraged and determined to avenge his father's death, he injected himself with the DNA of several infamous criminals, mutating him into his present form. After realizing that she and the Key Man are seeking vengeance on the same man, Ruka slices him in half with her katana before heading back to the precinct. On her way, she witnesses the police force brutalizing civilians accused of being Engineers. When her friend, a local bar owner (Ikuko Sawada), is drawn and quartered, Ruka's left arm mutates into an alien-like head with razor-sharp claws before she beheads the officers behind the execution. During her rampage, she is shot in the right eye by one of the officers, but her body quickly replaces it with a cybernetic eye. She confronts the police commissioner, who admits to her father's assassination, but explains that upon learning of the Key Man and the Engineers, he raised her to become the perfect Engineer Hunter as a form of atonement. Following a grueling sword fight, Ruka dismembers and eventually decapitates the commissioner — effectively bringing down his reign on the police force.

During the end credits, it is revealed that the Key Man is still alive, having mended himself back into one piece with the help of one of his test subjects.

Cast
 Eihi Shiina as Ruka
 Itsuji Itao as Akino Miyama/The Key Man
 Yukihide Benny as Tokyo Police Chief Officer
 Jiji Bū as Barabara-Man
 Ikuko Sawada as Bar Independent Owner
 Shun Sugata as Tokyo Police Commissioner General
 Tak Sakaguchi as Koji Tenaka
 Keisuke Horibe as Ruka's Father
 Shōko Nakahara as Prostitute Club Owner
 Cherry Kirishima
 Mame Yamada
 Marry Machida
 Maiko Asano
 Ayano Yamamoto
 Tsugumi Nagasawa as Alligator Girl
 Cay Izumi as Dog Girl
 Sayako Nakoshi as Snail Girl
 Moko Kinoshita

Production
While working on special effects for Noboru Iguchi's The Machine Girl, Yoshihiro Nishimura was asked by Media Blasters if he wanted to do another film. Nishimura decided to make Tokyo Gore Police, a remake of an independent film that he made many years before called Anatomia Extinction which received the Special Jury Award in the Off Theatre competition at the 1995 Yubari International Fantastic Film Festival.  Shot and completed in just two weeks, Tokyo Gore Police would be Nishumura's first commercial film.

The fight choreographer for the film was Taku Sakaguchi who Nishimura has worked with previously on the film Meatball Machine. The comical yet satirical television commercial scenes in the film were filmed by Noboru Iguchi and Yūdai Yamaguchi. Yamaguchi suggested this to bring a different flavor to the film to balance out the rest of the film's more dark tone.

Release
Tokyo Gore Police premiered in several film festivals before being released in Japan. The film had its North American premiere at the New York Asian Film Festival on June 21, 2008. The film premiered in Canada at the Fantasia Festival on July 12, 2008. The film has its Asian premiere at the Puchon International Fantastic Film Festival in July 2008.

A Region 1 DVD of the film was released on January 13, 2009 by Tokyo Shock A Region 2 DVD of the film was released on April 13, 2009 by 4Digital Media.
A straight to video prequel has been announced for release in Japan.

Critical reception 

Tokyo Gore Police was received well by American critics on its original release. The film ranking website Rotten Tomatoes reported a 82% "Fresh" rating and an average rating of 6 out of 10, based upon a sample of eleven reviews. Brian Chen reviewed Police with a score of 3.5/5. He comments, "It's not a horrible film; it's not a great film; it's just everything it tries to be — perverse, grotesque, bizarre — and a little more." V.A. Musetto of the New York Post gave the film three stars out of four calling the film "bloody good". Michael Esposito of the Chicago Tribune gave the film three stars noting the film as "sick, twisted and gory, but surprisingly funny in an adolescent boy fantasy way — Beavis and Butt-head would love it."

Russel Edwards of Variety claimed, "Like Tokyo Shock's recent "Machine Girl," for which helmer provided gore effects, [the] pic[ture] will fleetingly exist in midnight sidebars at fests and much longer on fanboy ancillary." Edwards also said that Tokyo Gore Police had "occasionally witty moments, but the relentless catalog of mutilations lacks the emotional power of similar fare in pics by, say, fellow Japanese gorehound Shinya Tsukomoto [sic]."

References

External links
 
 
 

2008 films
2008 action thriller films
Japanese action films
Japanese action thriller films
Japanese science fiction horror films
2000s Japanese-language films
Films directed by Yoshihiro Nishimura
Dystopian films
Girls with guns films
Nikkatsu films
Tokyo Shock
Japanese science fiction films
Japanese horror films
Japanese splatter films
2000s exploitation films
Japanese action horror films
Japanese comedy horror films
Japanese action comedy films
2000s action comedy films
Japanese comedy films
2008 comedy films
2000s monster movies
Japanese films about revenge
2008 science fiction action films
2000s Japanese films